Clubul Sportiv Municipal Târgu Mureș is a Romanian multi-sport club based in Târgu Mureș, Romania.

History 
The club was founded on 19 December 2017 by the decision of the local council of Târgu Mureș and began its activity in the summer of 2018 in order to bring back to life the sport from the city, which almost totally collapsed during the 2017–18 season. The first sections set up at the new club were: football, basketball, handball, volleyball, futsal, swimming, wrestling, bowling, athletics, tennis, table tennis, martial arts, motorsport, weightlifting, cycling, water polo, and fencing.
From 2021, after reorganization of the club, CSM Targu Mures has 12 sections

Archery  
One of the best romanian young archer, Móréh Tamás continuing his carrier under the colour of CSM Targu Mures. The club managed to bring him home from another club from Romania.

Athletics  
Headcoach: Buhlea Gheorghe

Autosport   
The autosport has a very reach tradition in Targu Mures. This section of CSM Targu Mures involving a few very good driver from the city. Head of department: Kovács "Kopek" Levente

Basketball 
Men's basketball section was established to supplement the space left by the disappearance of previous teams and clubs. Now we have a good Liga I team, with former National League players, only two of them wasn't born in Mureş. The team's coach is Trif George. The goal of the team is to promote to the National League (Liga Naţională).

Boxing  
Headcoach: Daniel Ghiurca

Futsal 
The futsal team of CSM want to continue the tradition of these young sport, Târgu Mureş was six times Romanian champion and Cup winner, also played in Futsal UEFA Cup, the Champions League of this sport. Coach: Kacso Endre

Handball 
The handball section was founded to supplement the space left by the disappearance of the old club, SC Mureșul, also dissolved during the 2017–18 season. Now the club has a junior III women team. Headcoach Pop Laurentiu.

Ice hockey  
The newest sport in town, which also have a very long history early 1950-1990, was revived in 2021. CSM Targu Mures manage a U14 team. Head of department: Kui Csaba

Nine pin bowling 
Men's and women's nine pins bowling section of CSM continue the tradition of this sport in town. Coaches: Seres József and Orosz István

Swimming   
CSM Targu Mures provides continuity for swimmers who have outgrown their youth category and have nowhere to continue their careers in the city. Headcoah: Bartalis Károly

Water polo  
CSM Targu Mures embraced the senior and U19 women teams. Th U19 team finished in second place in National Championship, and it's the third team in the Mures County DJTS (Directia Nationala de Tineret si Sport) 2021 annual ranking in olympic sport teams category. Headcoach: Ispir Cristian

Wrestling  
One of the best sections of the CSM Targu Mures. With many wrestlers who concerned national and international titles. In the Mures County DJTS (Directia Nationala de Tineret si Sport) 2021 annual ranking in olympic sports, Bíró Krizstián finished the year in the third place in senior category, and Lircă Georgiana was the best junior athlete of the year. Also the best sport team in Mures was our wrestling team, which concern the national title in U17 and U20, and finished in second place the adults Superliga in common with the CSS Targu Mures team. Head of department: Gyarmati Ferenc

References

Sports clubs established in 2017
Multi-sport clubs in Romania
Sport in Târgu Mureș
CSM Târgu Mureș
2017 establishments in Romania